During the 2000–01 English football season, Charlton Athletic competed in the FA Premier League.

Season summary
Alan Curbishley and his Charlton side won many admirers after their Division One title glory gained them promotion back to the Premiership at the first time of asking. This time he kept them there with an excellent ninth-place finish and 52 points. They would have finished higher still - and possibly qualified for Europe - had their defence not been the leakiest of any in the top 15 and the sixth leakiest in the division. Still, it was a superb achievement for a side who had been among the favourites of many punters to suffer an immediate return to the Nationwide League. The arrival of striker Jason Euell from Wimbledon in a club record deal gave fans hope of more success in 2001–02.

Final league table

Results summary

Results by round

Results
Charlton Athletic's score comes first

Legend

FA Premier League

FA Cup

League Cup

Players

First-team squad
Squad at end of season

Left club during season

Reserve squad

Statistics

Starting 11
Considering starts in all competitions
 GK: #1,  Dean Kiely, 28
 RB: #2,  Radostin Kishishev, 28
 CB: #5,  Richard Rufus, 35
 CB: #36,  Mark Fish, 28
 LB: #3,  Chris Powell, 33
 RM: #20,  Claus Jensen, 41
 CM: #4,  Graham Stuart, 35
 CM: #8,  Mark Kinsella, 27
 LM: #11,  John Robinson, 23
 CF: #21,  Jonatan Johansson, 29
 CF: #26,  Mathias Svensson, 20 (#19,  Andy Todd, has 24 starts as a central defender)

Transfers

In

Out

Transfers in:  £9,150,000
Transfers out:  £350,000
Total spending:  £8,800,000

Loan out
  Kevin Lisbie -  Queens Park Rangers, 2 December, one month
  Kemal Izzet -  Colchester United, 22 March, one month

Notes

References

Charlton Athletic F.C. seasons
Charlton Athletic